Saku Salminen (born October 20, 1994) is a Finnish former professional ice hockey player. He most notably played in the Liiga.

Playing career
Salminen was selected by the Tampa Bay Lightning in the 7th round (184th overall) of the 2013 NHL Entry Draft.

Salminen made his SM-liiga debut playing with Jokerit during the 2012–13 SM-liiga season.

Career statistics

Regular season and playoffs

International

References

External links

1994 births
Living people
Anglet Hormadi Élite players
Finnish ice hockey forwards
HPK players
Jokerit players
ESV Kaufbeuren players
Kiekko-Vantaa players
SaiPa players
Ice hockey people from Helsinki
Tampa Bay Lightning draft picks
TuTo players